Face Value is a 1927 American silent drama film directed by Robert Florey and starring Fritzi Ridgeway, Gene Gowing and Betty Baker.

Synopsis
After being badly wounded in the face during World War I, an American soldier remains in Paris after the war rather than return home to face his family and sweetheart.

Cast
 Fritzi Ridgeway as Muriel Stanley 
 Gene Gowing as Howard Crandall 
 Betty Baker as Calra 
 Paddy O'Flynn as Bert 
 Jack Mower as Arthur Wells 
 Edwards Davis as Crandall Sr 
 Joe Bonner as Butler

References

Bibliography
 Munden, Kenneth White. The American Film Institute Catalog of Motion Pictures Produced in the United States, Part 1. University of California Press, 1997.

External links

1927 films
1927 drama films
Silent American drama films
Films directed by Robert Florey
American silent feature films
1920s English-language films
Films set in Paris
Films set in the 1910s
American black-and-white films
1920s American films